Kiloo Games (commonly abbreviated as Kiloo and stylized in uppercase in its logo) is a Danish video game developer. It was founded in 2000 by Jacob Møller, with a focus on developing entertainment content for game console and handheld devices. In 2008, he was joined by his brother, Simon Møller. Together, they both run Kiloo.

Kiloo's best known game, Subway Surfers, was released in the spring of 2012 and was developed in cooperation with SYBO Games. A few weeks after its release, the free running game for iOS was named Game of the Week for 31 May 2012 by AppAdvice. In September, the game made its way to Android and gathered even more enthusiastic players. 
One month after the Android release, Subway Surfers made it into the top 20 growing Facebook apps by monthly active users. In July 2014, the game exceeded five hundred million downloads across all platforms. In September 2015, the download numbers reached 1 billion.

History
KILOO was founded in 2000, in a small apartment in Aarhus, Denmark, as a two-person company. In 2002, the partnership dissolved and KILOO changed into a private company. In the same year, KILOO won the Nokia Mobile Challenge in the games category ahead of 500 competing companies, with their game Popstar, built on a Tamagotchi-like concept of managing the career and basic needs of an upcoming pop music star.

KILOO later entered an agreement with THQ Wireless to develop the game Worms for mobile. KILOO also cooperated with ITE on the development and distribution of mobile content based on the TV and game character Hugo. By 2004, the Hugo games had been bought by 1 million people.

Between 2006 and 2009, KILOO had the exclusive mobile rights for LEGO worldwide. In 2007, KILOO broke into Børsen’s "Fast Track 100", which placed it in the league of Denmark’s fastest growing private companies. In the same year, KILOO acquired the exclusive rights for Whac-a-Mole worldwide with reference to developing and selling Whac-a-Mole mobile content.

In 2008, KILOO raised capital from Danish VC FirmaInvest for further growth.

In 2009, KILOO licensed the full suite of Wham-O rights for mobile (HackySack, SuperBall, Frisbee and Hula Hoop), which so far has resulted in Frisbee Forever and Frisbee Forever 2.

In 2011, KILOO launched two games (Frisbee Forever and Bullet Time HD) and numerous apps.

In 2012, KILOO released two successful games, Subway Surfers and Frisbee Forever 2, a sequel to Frisbee Forever, which had launched one year before.

In October 2014, KILOO released Smash Champs, which turned out to be another success.

In March 2015, KILOO released Stormblades, which was co-produced with the Canadian developer Emerald City Games.

In March 2016, KILOO released Tesla Tubes.

KILOO Groups 
In 2013, KILOO Group was founded by integrating three subsidiary companies in the KILOO family: Manatee, Katoni and GivingTales.

Manatee 
The company was established in 2012, and focuses on apps development. Customers include McDonald’s Denmark. The McDonald’s Coinoffers app was developed in cooperation with DDB Copenhagen. The campaign, including the app, won gold and silver in the categories “Integrated Campaigns”, “Events & Digital Events”, “Digital Campaigns” and “Brand Driven Apps & Utilities” at the CCA 2012. The campaign won also a Bronze Lion in the category “Best Integrated Campaign Led by Mobile” at Cannes Lions 2012 and another Bronze Lion in the category “Best Use of Integrated Media”.

Katoni 
Katoni ApS was established in 2014 and specializes in the development of online shopping portals. In June 2014, Katoni launched Katoni.dk, a shopping portal for fashion. In 2016, Katoni expanded to Norway (Katoni.no) and in 2017 to Finland (Katoni.fi).

GivingTales 
GivingTales is a cooperation between KILOO and evershift. The project was established in 2012 to develop an app with versions of popular Hans Christian Andersen fairy tales for children. The tales are narrated by actors and celebrities. The app was developed in Budapest (Hungary), and it was released in June 2015, on App Store, Google Play Store and Windows Phone 8 Store with the following stories:
 "The Princess and the Pea", narrated by Roger Moore
 "The Ugly Duckling", narrated by Stephen Fry
 "The Little Match Girl", narrated by Ewan McGregor
 "The Emperor’s New Clothes", narrated by Joan Collins
 "The Snow Queen", narrated by Joanna Lumley
 "Little Claus and Big Claus", narrated by Michael Caine
 "The Little Mermaid", narrated by David Walliams
 "Thumbelina", narrated by Charlotte Rampling
 "It's Quite True!", narrated by Paul McKenna
 "The Nightingale", narrated by Michael Ball

Games
KILOO has created games licensed from brands and companies such as:
 Maya the Bee and Friends for mobile – 2006
 Hugo: Black Diamond Fever for mobile – 2004
 Happy Tree Friends
 Whac-a-mole for iPhone
 Commodore 64 for iPhone
 Subway Surfers for iPhone, Android, and Windows Phone
 Smash Champs for iPhone and Android
 Stormblades for iPhone and Android – March 19, 2015
 Tesla Tubes for iPhone and Android – March 17, 2016
 Dawnbringer for iPhone and Android

In 2010, KILOO Games announced a new original IP called Zoonies - Escape from Makatu for Nintendo DSiWare. It was sponsored by the New Danish Screen.

In 2011, KILOO released Frisbee Forever and BulletTime HD.

In 2012, the endless running game Subway Surfers was released in co-production with Sybo Games, and KILOO continued the series with Frisbee Forever 2.

Media
In 2008, KILOO started developing mobile applications alongside game development. These include:
 Issuu Mobile – a magazine reader for iPhone
 JokeToons – animated videocontent for iPhone
 Games licensed from Wham-O

References 

Software companies of Denmark
Mobile game companies
Companies based in Aarhus
Danish companies established in 2000
Video game companies established in 2000
Video game companies of Denmark